The stone put is one of the main Scottish heavy athletic events at modern-day Highland games gatherings. While similar to the shot put, the stone put more frequently uses an ordinary stone or rock instead of a steel ball. The weight of the stone will vary from 16 to 26 lb for men (or 8 to 18 lb for women) depending on which type of stone put event (Braemar stone or Open stone) is being contested and also on the idiosyncrasies of the event (mainly because stones in use have no standard weight). There are also some differences in allowable techniques and rules.

Robert Burns was keen on stone putting and apparently left his favourite putting stone at Ellisland Farm near Dumfries. If he saw anyone using it whilst he lived there he would call "Bide a wee" and join in the sport, always proving that he was the strongest man there.

Origin of the stone put

As with most aspects of the Scottish Highland games, and Scottish Highlands culture generally, a certain amount of legend has grown around the origins and antiquity of the stone put.

Michael Brander, in his 1992 book Essential Guide to the Highland Games, reports on some of the stories concerning the stone put which have become traditional. He discusses what have become known to tradition as the "stones of strength" which were of two types. In one, the Clach Cuid Fir (or Manhood Stone), a very large stone of well over 100 lb is employed and the test is to be able to lift it to a certain height or place it on a wall.

In the other type, the Clach Neart (or Stone of Strength), a smaller stone, variable in weight, but around 20 or 30 lb, is employed. The object is to see how far the stone could be thrown or putted.

In addition to the Highland Games, throughout European history the stone put has been a popular form of exercise with records dating from Ancient Greece. It was also a popular leisure activity in the medieval ages. The practice of heavy stone throwing also continues as part of Unspunnenfest, which is a traditional Swiss festival which dates from the 13th Century. It features the throwing of an 83kg stone. The event, called the steinstossen, typically uses a two arm throwing style.

See also
Ballistic training
Clach-ultaich
Steinstossen

References

Michael Brander, Essential Guide to the Highland Games
David Webster, Scottish Highland Games

Highland games
Individual sports
Throwing sports
Sports originating in Scotland
Strength sports